Dillon Dam Brewery is a brewery and restaurant located in Dillon, Colorado, U.S.A. 

The brewery opened in February 1997 and is located near Keystone Resort.  It has won several awards for its beers.  They include:
Silver Medal at the 2001 Great American Beer Festival for Dam Straight Lager
Gold Medal at the 2002 World Beer Cup for their Sweet George's Brown
Bronze Medal at the 2004 Great American Beer Festival for their Extra Pale Ale
Gold Medal at the 2008 Great American Beer Festival for its Sweet George's Brown

References

External links 
Dillon Dam Brewery Website
Review at RealBeer.com

Beer brewing companies based in Colorado
Restaurants in Colorado
Companies based in Colorado
Tourist attractions in Summit County, Colorado
American companies established in 1997
1997 establishments in Colorado